Narungga is an Australian aboriginal people.

Narungga may also refer to.

Electoral district of Narungga, an electorate in Australia
Narungga language, an Australian aboriginal language